Darrell L. Bock (born December 12, 1953) is an American evangelical New Testament scholar. He is Executive Director of Cultural Engagement at The Hendricks Center and Senior Research Professor of New Testament studies at Dallas Theological Seminary (DTS) in Dallas, Texas, United States.  Bock received his PhD from Scotland's University of Aberdeen. His supervisor was I. Howard Marshall. Harold Hoehner was an influence in his NT development, as were Martin Hengel and Otto Betz as he was a Humboldt scholar at Tübingen University multiple years.

His works include the monograph "Blasphemy and Exaltation" in the collection Judaism and the Final Examination of Jesus, and volumes on Luke in both the Baker Exegetical Commentary on the New Testament and the IVP New Testament Commentary Series. Bock is a past president of the Evangelical Theological Society, and he is a member of the board of trustees of Wheaton College (Illinois). He has served as a corresponding editor for Christianity Today, and he has published articles in the Los Angeles Times and The Dallas Morning News.

Bock is known for his work concerning The Da Vinci Code by Dan Brown. In a response to the theological implications of the novel, Bock wrote Breaking the Da Vinci Code, his best-selling work to date. The book challenges the historicity of various extra-biblical ideas expressed in The Da Vinci Code, most notably the supposed marriage of Jesus to Mary Magdalene. He also has written many pieces for Beliefnet and Christianity Today. Bock also wrote The Missing Gospels, which argues for the existence and legitimate primacy of early Christian orthodoxy over non-canonical gospels and beliefs.

On May 17, 2006, immediately before the film The Da Vinci Code opened, Bock appeared on the TV show Nightline, talking about his book and about the movie. Bock has debated agnostic biblical scholar Bart D. Ehrman on whether certain epistles in the New Testament have been forged.

In 2012, Darrell Bock became the executive director of cultural engagement at the Hendricks Center at DTS. He is also a host of The Table Podcast, Dallas Theological Seminary's weekly cultural engagement show. The other hosts of the podcast are Mikel Del Rosario, Bill Hendricks, and Kymberli Cook.

For several years he has been a Guest Lecturer at the Bible Institute of South Africa's Winter School in Cape Town, as well as at numerous other institutions globally.

Works

Books

 

 - forthcoming June 2019

Edited by

Chapters

Articles

Film

References

External links
Review by Thomas R. Schreiner of Blasphemy and Exaltation in Judaism and the Final Examination of Jesus: A Philological-Historical Study of the Key Jewish Themes Impacting Mark 14:61-64.
Journal of the Evangelical Theological Society,  Jun 2002. Review by Joel F. Williams of Blasphemy and Exaltation in Judaism: The Charge against Jesus in Mark 14:53-65
Interview with Darrell Bock on reliability of New Testament Documents  from the Centre for Public Christianity

1953 births
Living people
20th-century American male writers
20th-century evangelicals
21st-century American male writers
21st-century evangelicals
Alumni of the University of Aberdeen
American biblical scholars
American evangelicals
Dallas Theological Seminary faculty
Evangelical writers
New Testament scholars